The Louisiana Intelligence Digest was a racist publication allegedly published by Federal Bureau of Investigation agent and private investigator William Guy Banister.

The publication was an anti-communist rag, "which depicted integration as part of the Communist conspiracy".

References

Civil rights movement